Bairon et ses environs (literally Bairon and its surroundings) is a commune in the Ardennes department of northern France. The municipality was established on 1 January 2016 and consists of the former communes of Le Chesne, Les Alleux and Louvergny.

See also 
Communes of the Ardennes department

References 

Communes of Ardennes (department)

Communes nouvelles of Ardennes
Populated places established in 2016
2016 establishments in France